This article shows the rosters of the participating teams at the 1994 FIVB Volleyball Men's World Championship in Greece.

(1st)

 Coach: Julio Velasco

(2nd)

 Coach: Joop Alberda

(3rd)

(4th)

 Coach: Marino Juan Diaz

(5th)

 Coach: José Roberto Guimarães

(6th)

 Coach: Gilberto Herrera

(7th)

(8th)

 Coach: In-Taik Yang

(9th)

 Coach: Bmunko Gavrilov

(9th)

 Coach: Clement Lemieux

(9th)

(9th)

 Coach: Seiji Oko

(13th)

 Coach: Fulin Shen

(13th)

 Coach: Daniel Castellani

(13th)

 Coach: Anders Kristiansson

(13th)

 Coach: Slimane Abderrahmane

References

External links
Results and teams

1994 in volleyball
FIVB Volleyball Men's World Championship squads